Stefanik or Štefánik may refer to:
 Milan Rastislav Štefánik (1880–1919), Slovak politician
 Armored train Štefánik, train used in Slovakia during World War II
 Elise Stefanik (born 1984), American politician
 Marcin Stefanik (born 1987), Polish footballer
 Mike Stefanik (1958-2019), American stock car racing driver
 M. R. Štefánik Airport, airport in Bratislava, Slovakia
 Samuel Štefánik (born 1991), Slovak footballer

Slovak-language surnames
Polish-language surnames